Kerry Lee  is an Afrikaans singer with a Modern Country sound.

Lee was born on 15  November 1989 in Durban. Her debut album "Vou Jou Arms Om My"  recorded by Anton Botha was released in 2010.

In 2009 she sang the theme song for “Love & Mortar” on DSTV channel 182, followed by the theme song for “Street Rods Africa” in 2010.

In 2012 Lee released a new single "Met Ringe en Woorde"". This song was a hit on radio stations in South Africa.

In 2013 Lee and Hugo Ludik, founder of the South African group  ADAM and director of Muse Productions, released two singles "Shut Up en Soen My" & "Kaalvoet Boerseun".

Lee and songwriters Vaughn Gardiner and Roux Cloete released the album "Dans in die Reën".

Awards and recognition 
Lee was nominated for two Ghoema Music Awards in 2017: Best Country Album, and Publi'cs Favourite Female Artist.

Discography 
 Vou Jou Arms Om My, 2010
 Dans in die Reën, 2016

References

External links
 Official website

1989 births
Living people
Afrikaans-language singers
21st-century South African women singers
South African songwriters
South African women record producers